Union Rhythm Kings (established 2007 in Stockholm, Sweden) is a Norwegian - Swedish sextet performing traditional New Orleans jazz. The band was founded by the trombonist Kristoffer Kompen.

Biography 
Union Rhythm Kings have undertaken several tours in Norway and Sweden since 2008, where they played in various jazz clubs, concert halls, cultural and jazz festivals such as the Oslo Jazzfestival, the Trondheim Jazz Festival, Gothenburg Jazz Festival, Moldejazz and the Classic Jazzparty in Newcastle.

The band is a combination of Swedish and Norwegian musicians of two generations, which has developed a genuine interest in the traditional New Orleans jazz from the 1920s and 1930s.

Personnel 
Bent Persson, trumpet
Lars Frank - clarinet & saxophone
Kristoffer Kompen - trombone
Jacob Ullberger - banjo & guitar
Frans Sjöström - bass sax
Morten Gunnar Larsen - piano

Discography 
2008: A Hot Reunion! (Herman Records)
2015: Second Reunion

References 

Swedish jazz ensembles
Norwegian jazz ensembles
Musical groups established in 2007
2007 establishments in Sweden
Musical groups from Stockholm